Francis Joseph "Boley" Dancewicz (October 3, 1924 – June 26, 1985) was an American football quarterback who played professionally in the National Football League.  He was the first overall pick in the 1946 NFL Draft by the Boston Yanks.

He was a quarterback at Notre Dame and later played three seasons of pro football.

His son, Gary Dancewicz, played at Boston College.  Grandson Chris Pizzotti was a quarterback at Harvard.

References

External links

1924 births
1985 deaths
Sportspeople from Lynn, Massachusetts
Players of American football from Massachusetts
American football quarterbacks
Notre Dame Fighting Irish football players
National Football League first-overall draft picks
Boston Yanks players
Wilmington Clippers players